Yuetang District is one of two urban districts in Xiangtan City, Hunan Province, China. Located in the eastern region of the city proper and on the northeastern shoreside of the Xiang River, the district is bordered to the north by Tianxin and Yuhua Districts of Changsha City, to the east by Shifeng and Tianyuan Districts of Zhuzhou City, to the south by Xiangtan County, to the west by Hetang District. As of 2015, it had a registered population of 350,300 and a resident population of 467,800. The district has 14 subdistricts and a town under its jurisdiction, the government seat is at Bantang Subdistrict.

Administrative divisions
2 towns
 Yijiawan
 Shuangma
4 townships
Xiacheng
 Bantang 
 Hetang 
 Zhaoshan
14 subdistricts
 Wulidui
 Shejiancun
 Jianshelu
 Dongping
 Yutang Subdistrict
 Shuyuanlu
 Zhongzhoulu
 Xiashesi
 Xiacheng Subdistrict
 Hongqi Subdistrict, Xiangtan
 Baota Subdistrict
 Bantang
 Shuangma
 Hetang Subdistrict

References

www.xzqh.org 

 
Districts of Xiangtan